Colcabamba (from Quechua Qullqa Pampa, meaning "storehouse plain") is one of the seventeen districts of the Aymaraes Province in Peru.

Geography 
Other mountains are listed below:

Ethnic groups 
The people in the district are mainly indigenous citizens of Quechua descent. Quechua is the language which the majority of the population (70.41%) learnt to speak in childhood, 29.46% of the residents started speaking using the Spanish language (2007 Peru Census).

References

Districts of the Aymaraes Province
Districts of the Apurímac Region